William Bodrugan (fl. 1384–1401) was an English politician and grandson of politician Otto I Bodrugan (died 1331). He was a son of Otto Bodrugan.

He was a Member (MP) of the Parliament of England for Helston in April 1384, Launceston in February 1388 and Cornwall in 1401. He was tax collector of Cornwall (1404) and probably sheriff of Cornwall (1402–1403).

References

14th-century births
15th-century deaths
William
English MPs 1401
English MPs April 1384
English MPs February 1388
Members of the Parliament of England (pre-1707) for Cornwall
Members of the Parliament of England for Helston
Members of the Parliament of England for Launceston
Tax collectors